Veterans Memorial Highway is the name chosen for the following roads:

Canada

Alberta
Highway 36

British Columbia
Part of Highway 14

Newfoundland and Labrador
Route 75

New Brunswick
Part of Route 15

Nova Scotia
Part of Highway 102

Ontario
Highway 416
Highway 420 (Niagara Veterans Memorial Highway)
Veterans Memorial Parkway

Prince Edward Island
Route 2

Saskatchewan
Part of Highway 2

United States
I-15 in parts of Arizona Utah, and Idaho
Part of I-476 in the Delaware Valley
Interstate H-2 in Oahu, Hawaii
US 30 in East Liverpool, Ohio
County Road 476B (Sumter County, Florida)
New Jersey Route 55
New Mexico State Road 599
West Virginia Route 7 east of Morgantown, West Virginia
APD-40 in Cleveland, Tennessee
Veterans Memorial Parkway (Evansville), Indiana
Veterans Memorial Parkway, East Providence, Rhode Island

Georgia
US 25, US 301, Georgia State Route 67 Bypass (Statesboro), and Georgia State Route 73 Bypass (Statesboro)
US 78 connecting Villa Rica, Winston, Douglasville, Lithia Springs, and Mableton
Veterans Parkway (Savannah, Georgia)

Michigan
Multiple separate highways in Michigan each bear the designation "Veterans Memorial Highway", "Veterans Memorial Freeway", "Veterans Memorial Drive" or "Veterans Memorial Parkway":
I-69 between the eastern city limit of Flint and the western city limit of Port Huron
US 10 between Ludington and Scottville
US 23 in Bay City
US 127 Business in Ithaca
M-28 between Wakefield and the Ishpeming–Negaunee city line
M-32 in Alpena
M-33 between Rose City and Mio
M-59 between Pontiac and Utica
M-120 in Muskegon
M-125 in Monroe County

Nevada
US 93 Business from SR 173 to Railroad Pass Casino Road, the former route of US 93, US 95, and US 466
US 95 in parts of Nevada, excluding the I-80 concurrency
SR 173, the former route of US 95
SR 599 and US 95 Business, the former route of US 95 in Las Vegas
Railroad Pass Casino Road from US 93 Business to a dead end at the Railroad Pass Casino parking lot, the former route of US 93, US 95, and US 466

New York
New York State Route 454
I-481 and New York State Route 481

Notes

See also
 Veterans Highway
 Veterans Parkway (disambiguation)
 Vietnam Veterans Memorial Highway (disambiguation)

Lists of monuments and memorials in the United States
Lists of monuments and memorials in Canada